Anders Antonsen (born 27 April 1997) is a Danish badminton player. He won the gold medal at the 2015 European Junior Championships in the boys singles event, and at the same year was awarded the European Young Player of the Year. Together with the national team, he won the European Men's Team Championships in 2016 and 2018; also European Mixed Team Championships in 2017, 2019, 2021 and 2023. Antonsen was the champion at the 2019 Minsk European Games, 2021 European Championships, the silver medalist at the 2017 European Championships, and the 2019 World Championships, and the bronze medalist at the 2021 World Championships.

Career 
Antonsen started his career in badminton at six years of age in Kastanievej, Viby. Together with his brother Kasper Antonsen, they learned from his father who worked at one of the badminton clubs in Aarhus called AB.

He made his international debut at the 2013 Forza Denmark International tournament. In 2015, he won the European Junior Championship, defeating German player Max Weißkirchen with a score of 21–9, 15–21, 21–9 in the final. In the same year, he also won several tournaments such as Dutch International, Belgian International, and Irish Open, and awarded the 2015 European Young Player of the Year.

In 2016, he won his first Grand Prix, the Scottish Open Grand Prix. In the same year, he also won several other tournaments such as the Spanish International, Austrian Open, and Swedish Master.

In 2017, he won the silver medal at the European Championship after being defeated by Rajiv Ouseph of England with a tight score of 19–21, 19–21. He also reached the semifinals in two Superseries tournaments, the 2017 French Open where he lost to Kenta Nishimoto from Japan with a score of 17–21, 15–21, and later the Hong Kong Open where he was defeated by 2016 Rio Olympics gold medal winner Chen Long from China with a score of 14–21, 21–19, 17–21.

In 2018, Antonsen was chosen to be part of the Danish Thomas Cup team and won a bronze medal. At the Denmark Open Super 750 tournament, he managed to reach the semifinals but was defeated at that stage by Chinese Taipei player Chou Tien-chen with a score of 21–19, 11–21, 12–21.

Play for the Aarhus AB, Antonsen won the National Championships title three times in a row from 2017–2019. He won the BWF World Tour title at the 2019 Indonesia Masters, defeating 2018 World Champion and then World number 1 Kento Momota from Japan in the final with a score of 21–16, 14–21, 21–16. He emerged as the men's singles champion and took the gold medal at the 2019 Minsk European Games beat Brice Leverdez of France in the final with the score 21–19, 14–21, 21–10. At the 2019 Indonesia Open a Super 1000 tournament, Antonsen managed to step into the final round but he had to be satisfied as runner-up after losing to Chou Tien-chen with a score of 18–21, 26–24, 15–21. Antonsen captured the silver medal at the 2019 World Championships in Basel, Switzerland, lost to the first seeded, the reigning champion Kento Momota in straight games 9–21, 3–21.

Antonsen won the end of the season 2020 BWF World Tour Finals beating Viktor Axelsen in the finals.

In 2021, Antonsen participated at the European Mixed Team Championships in Finland, and helped the team win the gold medal. At the May European Championships, he was crowned as the men's singles champion, after organizers decided to cancel the finals, due to his opponent, Viktor Axelsen, tested positive for COVID-19.

Antonsen clinched a bronze medal after he lost in the semifinals of the 2021 World Championships to Loh Kean Yew, the eventual World Champion, in straight games, 21–23, 14–21.

Starting off the season in 2022, Antonsen managed to avenge his loss to Loh Kean Yew in the World Championships semi finals, winning against the reigning world champion in the first round of the All England Open, in rubber games, 21–15, 18–21, 21–13. He then lost in the next round to Lakshya Sen, in straight games, 16–21, 18–21.

On 30 April, Antonsen won silver at the European Championships losing to compatriot Viktor Axelsen (17–21, 15–21) in the finals in Madrid, Spain. Antonsen was very upset over the quality of his own play, saying audiences nearly deserved an apology.

Antonsen then pulled out of the Asian leg of tournaments, the Indonesia Masters, the Indonesia Open, the Malaysian Open, the Malaysian Masters and the Singapore Open, citing injuries.

Personal life 

Antonsen has an older brother, Kasper Antonsen. He is a former Danish badminton national player, and has trained with his brother since young.

Antonsen co-hosts a podcast together with fellow Danish badminton player Hans-Kristian Vittinghus, called The Badminton Experience, where they cover many different topics on badminton, ranging from players and technical aspects of the game. They also host Q&A sessions from time to time, and sometimes, they invite other badminton players to come on the podcasts as guests, to share their experience and answer questions from the hosts. Notable players that have been on the podcast include Lee Zii Jia, Greysia Polli, Anthony Sinisuka Ginting and former Danish Men's singles player Peter Gade.

Besides recording podcast episodes with Vittinghus, Antonsen also has a YouTube channel, where he uploads his vlogs, mainly about his training and tour life on the BWF circuit. His YouTube channel has 101,000 subscribers as of July 2022.

Achievements

World Championships 
Men's singles

European Games 
Men's singles

European Championships 
Men's singles

European Junior Championships 
Boys' singles

BWF World Tour (3 titles, 4 runners-up) 
The BWF World Tour, which was announced on 19 March 2017 and implemented in 2018, is a series of elite badminton tournaments sanctioned by the Badminton World Federation (BWF). The BWF World Tour is divided into levels of World Tour Finals, Super 1000, Super 750, Super 500, Super 300 (part of the HSBC World Tour), and the BWF Tour Super 100.

Men's singles

BWF Grand Prix (1 title) 
The BWF Grand Prix had two levels, the Grand Prix and Grand Prix Gold. It was a series of badminton tournaments sanctioned by the Badminton World Federation (BWF) and played between 2007 and 2017.

Men's singles

  BWF Grand Prix Gold tournament
  BWF Grand Prix tournament

BWF International Challenge/Series (6 titles, 1 runner-up) 
Men's singles

  BWF International Challenge tournament
  BWF International Series tournament
  BWF Future Series tournament

Career overview

Record against selected opponents 
Record against Year-end Finals finalists, World Championships semi-finalists, and Olympic quarter-finalists. Accurate as of 28 November 2022.

References

External links 
 
 Anders Antonsen on YouTube

1997 births
Living people
Sportspeople from Aarhus
Danish male badminton players
Badminton players at the 2020 Summer Olympics
Olympic badminton players of Denmark
Badminton players at the 2019 European Games
European Games gold medalists for Denmark
European Games medalists in badminton
21st-century Danish people